O. silvestrii may refer to:
 Odontomachus silvestrii, W.M. Wheeler, 1927, a carnivorous ant species in the genus Odontomachus
 Oligomyrmex silvestrii, Santschi, 1914, an ant species in the genus Oligomyrmex

See also
 Silvestrii (disambiguation)